Edgardo B. Maranan (1946 – May 8, 2019 was a Filipino poet, essayist, fiction writer, playwright, translator and writer of children's stories. He wrote in Filipino and in English.

Early life
He was born in Bauan, Batangas, Philippines in 1946. He grew up in Baguio, where he finished his high school education.

He represented the Philippines at the 1963 New York Herald Tribune World Youth Forum at the age of 16. At the age of 18, he joined Kabataang Makabayan and became a student activist He became a professor at the University of the Philippines from 1970-1972 where he taught political science and joined the underground movement when martial law was declared by Marcos.

Career
In 1985, he was the Philippine fellow at the Iowa International Writing program. He also became the National fellow for the poetry of the University of the Philippines creative writing center in 1988. He became a panelist at the Ubud Writers Festival in Bali in 2007. And he also served as a foreign information officer of the Philippine Embassy in London.

He returned to the Philippines in the late 2006 and had been a freelance writer.

Death and legacy
Maranan died on May 8, 2019.

Awards
Palanca Awards first prize winning works
1978	Ang Panahon ni Cristy - Full-length play
1984	Voyage: Poem - Poetry
1989	Pamana ng Bundok - Children's Short story
1992	Island and Hinterland - Essay
2000	Tabon and Other Poems - Poetry

In 2000 he was inducted into the Palanca Hall of Fame.

References

External links
Edgar B. Maranan: Open Library (2008). Retrieved March 28, 2017 from,  https://openlibrary.org/authors/OL1206744A/Edgar_B._Maranan

1946 births
2019 deaths
Writers from Batangas
People from Baguio
Filipino male poets
Academic staff of the University of the Philippines
Edgardo B. Maranan